Cyberpark Kozhikode is a Government of Kerala owned IT and technology park for the promotion and development of investment in IT and ITES industries in the Malabar region of Kerala. It was registered under the Societies Act 1860 on 28 January 2009. Cyberpark is set up by Kerala State IT Infrastructure Limited (KSITIL) and is headed by a Chief Executive Officer. In addition to this, it has a General Body and a Board of Governors, both of which include top officials of the government.

It has both SEZ (Special Economic Zone) and non-SEZ options. The Cyberpark Kozhikode is the third IT hub in Kerala, the other two being the Technopark at Thiruvananthapuram and the Infopark in Kochi.  of land at Nellikode will be notified under SEZ for investors. The first phase of the project is expected to be ready for allotment by March 2011.

It is situated in Nellikkode and Pantheeran Kavu villages of Kozhikode Taluk, near to Medical college at Chevayur. It is 25 km away from Kozhikode International Airport and 10 km from the seaport.

The Park Centre of the Cyberpark was opened on 15 February 2014 by Industrial Minister P.K. Kunhalikutty. The Park Centre comprises an area of 11,000 square feet with two floors and hosts the administrative office, three software development companies, main conference hall, a mini conference hall, two guest rooms and a cafeteria.

A 20-MW, 110-kV, gas-insulated substation and a second IT building for the park will be set up. Intelligent Street Lighting System to save energy. An inbuilt astronomical clock will switch on in the evening and off in the morning

It is one among the two major IT parks in Kozhikode. The other one being the UL Cyber Park under cooperative sector.

History

In January 2007, the Government of Kerala announced its decision to promote Kozhikode as an IT hub. The proposal to set up an IT park in Kozhikode came in the announcement of the State Government's IT policy made by Chief Minister V.S. Achuthanandan.

Soon after the proposal, a convention under the auspices of Calicut IT Initiative (CITI) in Kozhikode was organized. The CITI includes representatives of the Malabar Chamber of Commerce, Calicut Forum for IT (CAFIT), IIM-Kozhikode, Calicut Management Association, Kerala Builders Forum and NIT-Calicut among others. The name Cyberpark was suggested by the convention.

An appeal was also made to the Calicut Corporation to include the IT Park in the master plan that was being prepared for the city.

At this convention, many companies, including IBS, US Technology, NeST Software, Leela Group, and Finpro Business Solutions offered to set up their units in the Kozhikode IT unit.

By March 2008, official sources pointed out that already over 10 companies have shown interest in starting their organizations in this IT Park.

The Park Centre of Cybercity Kozhikode was formally opened by Industries Minister P.K. Kunhalikuttty on 15 February 2014.

The project is expected to be completed in 2015.

By May 2018 Minister for Labour T.P . Ramakrishnan opened the new company - Infinite Open Source Solutions LLP - in the first warm shell space at Sahya IT building, measuring 7,000 sq.ft Space. The Company incubated from Business Incubator TBI-NITC. On the same day three new companies have also logged into the Smart Business Centre at Sahya – Zinfog Codelabs Pvt. Ltd. and Ontash India Technologies. Hrishikesh Nair inaugurated the Smart Business Centre.

On 27 June 2018 two more companies named IPIX technologies and Yarddiant Weblounge started operations at cyber park. Both companies was inaugurated by Kerala IT Parks CEO Mr. Hrishikeshan Nair. IPIX Technologies, the IT arm of Kreston Menon Group, the leading auditing and business advisory in the Middle East. Yarddiant Weblounge Pvt. Ltd., a web development company serving digital marketing solutions to global clients, has also taken 1200 sq.ft 12-seater facility at the Smart Business Centre of the building. Yarddiant Weblounge Pvt. Ltd., headed by Prasoon Prahaladan and Neeraj Gupta, serves clients in Sweden, Bulgaria, Turkey, U.K., U.S. and Kenya with their main product Learning Management System.

As of 2021, there are 113 firms operating in the park. The area under lease has gone up from 8 per cent in 2017-18 to 73 per cent in 2020-21. The number of employees is 850. Software exports marked an increase of nearly 390% from ₹3,01,71,390 in 2017-18 to ₹14,76,10,856 in 2019-20. The SEZ approval for Sahya building was pivotal in this growth.

On 26th November 2022 Hexeam Software Solutions, a web and mobile application development company started their new office in cyber park. Hexeam Software Solutions , headed by Arabind T.K and Remin M, the company has various products such as Bionics cloud based ERP system, patient booking system, cloud based time attendance system etc., serves clients in USA, Europe and Middle east regions.

Expenditure

The Government expenditure towards the land acquisition for Cyberpark is estimated to be around 430 million INR and planned spoke-parks in Kannur and Kasaragod are estimated to cost 1.50 billion INR each, spread over a five-year period.

Total investment by the government will exceed 2.50 billion INR over the next two years.

Present Companies
Codilar Technologies, GrowthInfluencer, IOCode, Vinam Solutions, CodeAce Solutions, Zennode Technologies, SPRINTISLE DIGITAL SOLUTIONS PRIVATE LIMITED.
, GETLEAD, Tigabits, Analystor, M2H Infotech LLP., Technaureus Info Solutions Pvt. Ltd., 360 Dental Marketing Agency, Hexeam Software Solutions

References

External links 
 

Software technology parks in Kerala
Science and technology in Thiruvananthapuram
Organizations established in 2009
Special Economic Zones of India